Philodendron martianum, commonly known as pacová, is a species of plant in the family Araceae. It is native to southeastern Brazil.

References

martianum
Endemic flora of Brazil
Plants described in 1899